The 1997–98 season was Portsmouth's 99th in existence. After just missing out on the play-offs the previous season, Portsmouth saw themselves in a relegation battle this season.

League table

First squad
Squad at end of season

Transfers

In
  Hamilton Thorp -  West Adelaide, £75,000, 1 August
  Matthew Robinson -  Southampton, £50,000, February
  Craig Foster -  Marconi Stallions
  Robert Enes -  Sydney United
  Paul Harries -  Wollongong Wolves

References

Portsmouth F.C. seasons
Ports